Canine may refer to:

Zoology and anatomy
 a dog-like Canid animal in the subfamily Caninae
 Canis, a genus including dogs, wolves, coyotes, and jackals
 Dog, the domestic dog
 Canine tooth, in mammalian oral anatomy

People with the surname
 Henry Canine, American football coach
 Ralph Canine (1895–1969), founding director of the United States National Security Agency

Other uses
 Canine, a fictional dog in the Glenn Martin, DDS animated television series
 Canine Hills, Antarctic landform in the Bowers Mountains, Victoria Land

See also
 K9 (disambiguation)
 Kanine (disambiguation)
 Canina (disambiguation)
 Cani (disambiguation)
 List of canids